Béla III  High School (III. Béla Gimnázium) was founded in 1757. It is in Baja, Hungary.

Overview
There are more than 50 teachers. 
The school has 4-year and 6-year courses between the ages of 12 and 18. There are about 700 students in 22 study groups (classes).
All of the school's first course pupils participate in a one-week course related to studying.

The school teaches foreign languages; English, German, French, Italian, Russian and Latin.

Most of the study groups and classes are specialized in maths, foreign languages, or communication-drama-media studies. Students can participate in clubs and study groups preparing for study contests, language exams and universities.

More than 90% of the students successfully get into a university or a college. The institute is in 19th place among more than 400 Hungarian high schools.

The school teaches computer science and provides Internet access to all students. They also use multimedia equipment in their teaching process. The school uses its school website as an online database for teachers, students and parents and it is used to contact former students.

Bela III was one of the five "Recommended Schools" in Childnet Awards 2000. The school's staff plans to start "Blue Danube", an international project for schools located on the river Danube.

The school has a student senate. Children can participate in the musical and drama studio, choir or visual art studio, write the school newspaper 3-4 times a year and organize sports activities and traditional school events during the school year. 
It is one of the first schools in Hungary to use the Comenius 2000 educational quality assurance process.

See also
 Baja

External links
 Home page
 Baja city's home page
 Famous teachers

Gymnasiums in Hungary
Buildings and structures in Bács-Kiskun County